Santa Fe 108, formerly Santa Fe 98 (BNSF 98), is a 1967 General Motors Electro-Motive Division FP45 diesel locomotive once owned by the Atchison, Topeka and Santa Fe Railway and is today on permanent, operational display at the Southern California Railway Museum in Perris, California.

It is especially notable as being the last passenger locomotive purchased by the railroad and was used on Santa Fe's finest passenger trains, including the Super Chief between Chicago and Los Angeles. Relegated to freight service in 1971 when passenger rail operations were transferred to Amtrak, 108's paint scheme was slightly altered to have the large red Santa Fe lettering. It continued regular revenue freight service until it was renumbered to 98 in the early 1990's and transferred to BNSF after the ATSF and BN merged in 1995. It kept its number and was used for BNSF Business trains, but was never put in regular service. It was donated to the Orange Empire Railway Museum by the Burlington Northern Santa Fe in 1999.

After its donation, 98 was put in occasional passenger excursion service until the mid-2000's, when it was used for demonstrations. It underwent an extensive restoration starting in late 2012 which was completed in late 2018. The completed restoration returned it to its as delivered external arrangement, including the original Santa Fe passenger paint scheme and renumbering back to ATSF #108.

Until December 2012, when restoration began, the locomotive was used in demonstration service at the museum and special excursions. It is now maintained in service-ready condition for demonstration service at the museum.

References

External links 
ATSF 98 page at www.oerm.org

Perris, California
C-C locomotives
Diesel-electric locomotives of the United States
Electro-Motive Division locomotives
Landmarks of Riverside County, California
Railway locomotives introduced in 1967
Atchison, Topeka and Santa Fe Railway locomotives
Preserved diesel locomotives